José Mamerto Gómez Hermosilla (11 May 1771, in Madrid – 31 March 1837) was a Spanish Hellenist, journalist and writer.

Biography
Son of Vicente Gómez and Josefa de Hermosilla, he studied Latin and rhetoric with the Piarists of Getafe around 1782. At the college of St. Thomas of Madrid, he studied three years of philosophy; and four of theology, Ecclesiastic Discipline, and Literature in San Isidro. Beginning 1785 was one of the many academic theologists of St. Thomas.

1771 births
1837 deaths
Writers from Madrid
Spanish literary critics
Afrancesados